Harris Mountain is a peak in the Spring Mountains of southern Nevada, USA. It is in the Mount Charleston Wilderness.

References

External links 
 

Mountains of Clark County, Nevada
Mountains of Nevada